Takamori may refer to:

Places
Takamori, Kumamoto, a town in Kumamoto Prefecture, Japan
Takamori, Nagano, a town in Nagano Prefecture, Japan

People with the surname
 Akio Takamori (1950–2017), Japanese-American ceramic sculptor
, Japanese voice actress
, Japanese voice actress
, former Japanese football player and manager
, Japanese voice actress

People with the given name
, Japanese samurai
, Japanese politician

Japanese-language surnames
Japanese masculine given names